The 2021 Berlin referendum, formally referred to as Deutsche Wohnen & Co. enteignen or DW enteignen, was a referendum held and passed in Berlin in 2021. Voters were asked if they approved of the expropriation of the property of private real-estate companies with 3,000 or more units in the city, through public purchases by the Berlin state government. This would affect 243,000 rental apartments out of 1.5 million total apartments in Berlin. The largest such real-estate company is Deutsche Wohnen, for which the initiative is named, followed by Vonovia. In total, the referendum would impact 12 large real-estate companies.

The initiative for the referendum was originally launched in 2018. It successfully passed the first signature-collecting phase in July 2019, receiving at least 58,000 valid signatures of the 20,000 required; and the second phase in June 2021, receiving at least 175,000 of the 170,000 required.

The referendum took place on 26 September 2021 alongside the state and federal election. The expropriation proposal passed the legal quorum of 25% of eligible voters, receiving the approval of 57.6% of voters, while 39.8% voted against. The result is non-binding.

Background 
Article 14 of the German constitution states that "property entails obligations. Its use shall also serve the public good". This passage has been used previously in the past to advocate for pauses on rent increases or expropriation of high-volume property ownership.

Article 15 states the legal basis that "Grund und Boden [..] können zum Zwecke der Vergesellschaftung durch ein Gesetz [..] in Gemeineigentum.. überführt werden (Land, natural resources and means of production may, for the purpose of socialization, be transferred to public ownership or other forms of public enterprise by a law that determines the nature and extent of compensation). This Article has never been used before.

Even if the referendum passes, it would not be legally binding, and specific language would need to be spelled out, including compensation amounts which then would need to be passed by the Berlin Senate. The German constitution says the compensation amount should balance the interests of the public and other stakeholders. It would cost taxpayers an estimated amount between 7 and 36 billion euros, with the higher end being market rates. If the compensation amount is on the higher end, it could diminish the initiative's effectiveness.

Initiative

Signature collection—phase 1 
A total of 77,001 signatures were collected between April and July 2019. At least 58,000 of them were validated, exceeding the 20,000 signatures quorum required for a legal review by the Berlin Senate Department for the Interior and Sports.

Legal review 
The legal review by the Berlin Senate took place over a period of 441 days from 4 July 2019 to 17 September 2020. Interior Senator Geisel was accused of intentionally delaying the review by the initiative, The Left and Green parties. The text of the resolution was modified in order to be legally compliant.

Signature collection—phase 2 
A further 349,658 signatures were collected over a four month period between 26 February and 25 June 2021. At least 261,000 signatures were checked, with over 175,000 of them being legally valid, exceeding the quorum of 170,000 signatures or 7% of eligible voters (German Berlin citizens) required to initiate a public referendum. It was the highest number of signatures ever collected in a Berlin referendum.

Referendum 

With the signature collection phase cleared, a referendum was scheduled for 26 September 2021, the same time as the Berlin state and federal elections. A majority of votes in favour of the referendum and a minimum of 25% of all eligible voters in favour are needed for the referendum to succeed, approximately 625,000 votes. In 2013, the energy referendum was approved by 83% of those who voted, but failed because only 24.2% of Berlin voters voted in favour, while the quorum required was of 25% or more to do so.

Reception

Gallery

See also 

 Direct democracy in Berlin

References

External links

Referendum
2021 referendums
Housing in Germany
2021
Rent regulation